Gryffgryffgryffs: The 1996 Radio Sweden Concert is a live album by the Guy/Gustafsson/Strid Trio, featuring bassist Barry Guy, saxophonist Mats Gustafsson, and percussionist Raymond Strid, with guest artist Marilyn Crispell on piano. It was recorded on January 22, 1996, at the Radio House, Studio 2, in Stockholm, and was released by the Music & Arts label in 1997. In 2017, the album was reissued in digital form by Catalytic Sound.

The album title is a word that appears in James Joyce's Finnegans Wake, and that, according to author Gaurav Majumdar, suggests "stammering." The remaining track titles were inspired by Joyce ("Ififif"), Tony O'Mally ("Inscape"), Ted Hughes ("Org," "Ghast," and "Orghast") and Tekla Melin ("What Else?").

Reception

The editors of AllMusic awarded the album 4 stars.

The authors of The Penguin Guide to Jazz wrote: "The key sequence consists of three tracks, "Org," "Ghast," "Orghast," which seem to explore a carefully delimited range of ideas, except that Crispell is never content to remain within narrow harmonic or rhythmic bounds. It works, despite her overblown expressionism."

Track listing

 "Gryffgryffgryffs" – 7:25
 "Ififif" – 13:18
 "Inscape" – 7:25
 "Org" – 5:59
 "Ghast" – 14:48
 "Orghast" – 6:47
 "What Else?" – 8:28

Personnel 
 Mats Gustafsson – baritone saxophone, soprano saxophone, tenor saxophone
 Marilyn Crispell – piano
 Barry Guy – bass
 Raymond Strid – drums

References

1997 live albums
Mats Gustafsson live albums
Marilyn Crispell live albums
Barry Guy live albums
Music & Arts live albums